is a Japanese 4-panel comedy manga series by Daisuke Arakubo, serialized in Monthly Falcom Magazine. The manga was serialized to celebrate the video game company Nihon Falcom's 30th anniversary. Characters from their Ys and Trails franchises appear in the series.

It has been collected in four tankōbon volumes. An anime television series adaptation aired from January 2014 to March 2014, with a second season, Minna Atsumare! Falcom Gakuen SC, airing from January 2015 to March 2015.

Characters
Adol Christin

From the Ys series
Estelle Bright

From the Trails series
Joshua Bright

From the Trails series
Tio Plato

From the Trails series
Dark Fact

From the Ys series
Olivier Lenheim

From the Trails series
Lloyd Bannings

From the Trails series
Tita Russell

From the Trails series
Renne

From the Trails series
Dogi

From the Ys series
Geis

From the Ys series
Agate Crosner

From the Trails series
Rappy

From Ys vs. Trails in the Sky
Mishy

From the Trails series

Media

Manga

References

External links
 

Anime series based on manga
Comedy anime and manga
Manga based on video games
Seinen manga
Tokyo MX original programming
Yonkoma